Skidmore is an unincorporated community in Cherokee County, Kansas, United States.

History
A post office was opened in Skidmore in 1903, and remained in operation until it was discontinued in 1915.

Notable people
 Fred D. Beans, a decorated Marine Raider who rose to the rank of Brigadier General

References

Further reading

External links
 Cherokee County maps: Current, Historic, KDOT

Unincorporated communities in Cherokee County, Kansas
Unincorporated communities in Kansas